Copelatus parisii is a species of diving beetle. It is part of the genus Copelatus in the subfamily Copelatinae of the family Dytiscidae. It was described by Félix Guignot in 1959.

References

parisii
Beetles described in 1959